Leven may refer to:

People
 Leven (name), list of people with the name

Nobility
 Earl of Leven a title in the Peerage of Scotland

Placenames
 Leven, Fife, a town in Scotland
 Leven, East Riding of Yorkshire, a village in England
 Leven station (disambiguation)
 Loch Leven (disambiguation), several lakes of that name
 River Leven (disambiguation), several rivers of that name
 Municipality of Leven, former Local Government Authority in Tasmania. Now part of Central Coast Council.

Ships
, an Australian hopper ship in service 1966-88

See also 
 Levens (disambiguation)
 Levin (disambiguation)
 Leaven